The Boosmansbos Wilderness Area of  is situated  north of Heidelberg in the eastern Langeberg mountain chain of the Western Cape Province, South Africa. Boosmansbos, i.e. 'angry man's forest', is named after a resident hermit of the early 19th century who had been known to scare youngsters who visited his apiaries.

The elevation reaches  at Grootberg peak, located at the center of the wilderness area.

The wilderness area conserves mountain fynbos and valley forest. Among the special fynbos plants conserved are Erica and everlasting species as well as the rare Langeberg rambling aloe. Important forest tree species occurring in the valleys are sickle-leaved yellowwood, stinkwood and red alder.

The area receives rain in any month of the year, although mid summer and mid winter are the driest, when hot bergwind conditions may occur.  of footpaths allow access to the wilderness, among which a circular  section which can be completed in two days.

See also
 Protected areas of South Africa
 South African National Parks

References

CapeNature, Boosmansbos
SA places, Boosmansbos
Heidelberg information page

Provincial nature reserves of the Western Cape
Wilderness areas